Blue Commandos in Action (Comandos azules en acción) is a 1980 Argentine film.

References

External links 
 

1980 films
Argentine action films
1980s Spanish-language films
Argentine adventure films
1980s Argentine films
Films directed by Emilio Vieyra